Kevin Szalai is a Grand Prix motorcycle racer from France.

Career statistics

By season

Races by year
(key)

References

External links
 Profile on motogp.com

1992 births
French motorcycle racers
Living people
125cc World Championship riders
People from Forbach
Sportspeople from Moselle (department)